Bruno Mattiussi (26 August 1926 – 23 June 1981) was a Luxembourgian boxer. He competed in the men's light middleweight event at the 1952 Summer Olympics.

References

1926 births
1981 deaths
Luxembourgian male boxers
Olympic boxers of Luxembourg
Boxers at the 1952 Summer Olympics
People from Dudelange
Light-middleweight boxers